The Last Torch Song, better known under its Spanish title El último cuplé, is a 1957 Spanish jukebox musical film directed by Juan de Orduña and starring Sara Montiel, Armando Calvo and Enrique Vera.

It was released in Spain on 6 May 1957. It was immensely popular domestically and it had a wide international release making it the worldwide highest-grossing Spanish-language film made up to that point. The film's soundtrack album had also a wide international release.

Cast

Production
The filming took place in Barcelona between November 1956 and January 1957. Montiel accepted to star in the film as a deference to its director Juan de Orduña and during a vacation in Spain in between her Hollywood filmings Serenade and Run of the Arrow. The film was filmed with a very low budget. Initially, the songs in the film were going to be sung by a professional singer who would dub Montiel, but due to the low budget, she eventually sang the songs herself. Orduña had to sell the distribution rights to Cifesa to finance the completion of the filming.

Release
The Last Torch Song opened on 6 May 1957 in Spain. The film was running at the 1,400-seat Rialto Theatre for forty-seven weeks, making it the highest grossing film in Madrid in the 1950s. The film was there for so long that, as a result of the rain and the wind, the large billboard announcing the film had to be replaced by another, something unusual in the history of film exhibition in Spain. The film soundtrack album also became a hit.

The film had a wide international release with the dialogues dubbed or subtitled into other languages in non-Spanish speaking countries, while the songs kept in their original version. It was the worldwide highest-grossing Spanish-language film made up to that point, only surpassed in the 1950s–60s by her next film The Violet Seller, and catapulting Montiel's career as an actress and a singer.

Notes

References

Bibliography 
 Labanyi, Jo & Pavlović, Tatjana. A Companion to Spanish Cinema. John Wiley & Sons, 2012.

External links 
 

1957 musical films
Spanish musical films
1957 films
1950s Spanish-language films
Films directed by Juan de Orduña
1950s Spanish films